Ursula Hirst-Sheron (23 February 1909 – 30 October 2002) was a British character actress.

She was born in London, England.

She died in 2002 and is buried in Brompton Cemetery, London

Selected filmography
 It's in the Bag (1936)
 Please Turn Over (1959)
 This Is My Street (1964)

Selected stage
 The Constant Nymph (1926) (New Theatre)
 Admirals All (1934) (Cambridge Theatre)
 See How They Run (1944) (Q Theatre/Comedy Theatre)

References

External links

1909 births
2002 deaths
English stage actresses
English television actresses
Burials at Brompton Cemetery